José Ángel Hernández (August 1, 1985 – December 15, 2021), known as Flow La Movie, was a Puerto Rican music producer.

Career
He started his career in the music industry as a producer in 2011, which lasted ten years until his death. He launched his own indie record label and management agency and was a renowned producer and artist with chart-topping hits like "Te Boté”, which topped Hot Latin Songs for fourteen weeks, the third-most for Bad Bunny, per Billboard. He was also producer for Ozuna and Nio Garcia, behind the latter's viral hit “La Jeepeta".

Other ventures

Flow La Movie

Hernandez founded his record label Flow La Movie (FLM) in 2009 in partnership with his mother an current CEO Illianes Ruiz, while working with Nio García and Casper Mágico. Since founding the label he did reach the top Latin RIAA Certified récord in history with “Te Bote”.

Current artists

Former artists

Album releases
 2020: Now o Never by Nio García & Casper

Record production

Hernández also produces records, including his own, in December 2017, Hernandez produced the single “Te Bote” which went certified Dianond by the RIAA.

Death

Hernandez died on December 15, 2021, at the age of 36, when a charter plane Gulfstream IV carrying him and eight other people crashed and burst into flames while attempting an emergency landing near Las Américas International Airport. All the other people on board were also killed during the crash, including his wife and their 4-year old son.

References

External links
 
 

1985 births
2021 deaths
Puerto Rican record producers
Victims of aviation accidents or incidents in 2021
Victims of aviation accidents or incidents in the Dominican Republic
Place of birth missing